The 1990 Virginia Slims Championships was the season-ending women's tennis held at the Madison Square Garden in New York, United States between November 12 and November 18, 1990. Second-seeded Monica Seles won the singles title in the first five set women's final since Elisabeth Moore won the 1901 U.S. National Championships. Seles received $250,000 first-prize money. Martina Navratilova had qualified for the tournament but withdrew in order to undergo a knee operation.

Finals

Singles

 Monica Seles defeated  Gabriela Sabatini, 6–4, 5–7, 3–6, 6–4, 6–2.

Doubles

 Kathy Jordan /  Elizabeth Sayers defeated  Mercedes Paz /  Arantxa Sánchez Vicario, 7–6(7–4), 6–4.

References

External links
 
 ITF tournament edition details

WTA Tour Championships
WTA Tour Championships
WTA Tour Championships
WTA Tour Championships
1990s in Manhattan
WTA Tour Championships
Madison Square Garden
Sports competitions in New York City
Sports in Manhattan
Tennis tournaments in New York City